Boyd F. Edwards is an American physicist and professor of physics at Utah State University.

Education 
Edwards received a BS in Physics from Utah State University in 1980 and three years later received an MS in Physics from the same university. He received a PhD in Applied Physics from Stanford University in 1985.

Experience 
Edwards began serving as Professor of Physics at Utah State University on January 1, 2016, where he maintains an active research program in nonlinear dynamics, fluid physics, and statistical physics. Previously, he served for five years as Dean and Executive Director of Utah State University - Uintah Basin and as a professor of physics at West Virginia University, where he held the Russell and Ruth Bolton professorship for excellence in teaching.

Awards 
 John R. Williams Outstanding Teacher Award, 2017
 June Harless Award for Exceptional Teaching, 1998
 Physics Nominee for WVU College of Arts and Sciences Outstanding Researcher Award, 1992
 WVU College of Arts and Sciences Outstanding Teacher Award, 1992
 WVU Foundation (University-level) Outstanding Teacher Award, 1992

References

External links 
WVU physicist's study of chemical waves could aid research into flow of pathogens
www.youtube.com

Living people
American physicists
People from Utah
University of Utah alumni
Year of birth missing (living people)